Granny Takes a Trip was a boutique opened in February 1966 at 488 Kings Road, Chelsea, London, by Nigel Waymouth, his girlfriend Sheila Cohen and John Pearse. The shop, which was acquired by Freddie Hornik in 1969, remained open until the mid-1970s and has been called the "first psychedelic boutique in Groovy London of the 1960s".

It was also the name of a Purple Gang song of the 1960s, which was named after the store and banned by the BBC.

The name has been appropriated by clothing stores around the world that are not connected with the original Granny Takes a Trip, including present-day vintage fashion stores in Hermosa Beach, California, Sunset Boulevard and Sydney, Australia.

Opening 
The boutique was the brainchild of two young Londoners, Nigel Waymouth and Sheila Cohen, who were looking for an outlet for Cohen's ever-increasing collection of antique clothes. Waymouth, a freelance journalist, came up with the name and was offered the premises at 488 Kings Road, Chelsea, London, a previously unfashionable part of the road known as the World's End. In the summer of 1965, John Pearse who had trained as a tailor on Savile Row, agreed to join them in the venture. The shop opened in early 1966.

By the spring of 1966, the shop had achieved worldwide renown, including a feature in Time magazine "London: The Swinging City". They paved the way for many of the designer boutiques that followed, such as Mr. Freedom, Alkasura, Let It Rock, and later the more ambitious enterprises of Malcolm McLaren and Vivienne Westwood and Paul Smith. Over the next eight years the shop clothed London's fashionable young men and women, including many major rock performers. A constant stream of people visited the shop, especially on Saturdays during the weekly King's Road Parade.

Initially the ambience was a mixture of New Orleans bordello and futuristic fantasy. Marbled patterns papered the walls, with rails carrying an assortment of brightly coloured clothes. Lace curtains draped the doorway of its single changing room, and a beaded glass curtain hung over the entrance at the top of steps, which led on into the shop. In the back room, an art deco Wurlitzer blasted out a selection of music.

The shop became known for its changing façade. In 1966 it featured successively giant portraits of Native American chiefs Low Dog and Kicking Bear. In 1967 the entire front was painted with a giant pop-art face of Jean Harlow. That was later replaced by an actual 1948 Dodge saloon car which appeared to crash out from the window and onto the forecourt.

Acquisition by Freddie Hornik and opening of US outlets 
By the end of the decade, the partnership had lost momentum. Nigel Waymouth had become involved in poster and album cover design work, as one half of Hapshash and the Coloured Coat with Michael English (which then evolved into a musical group), and John Pearse left for Italy to work with the Living Theatre group.

In late 1969, Cohen and Waymouth sold the business to London fashion entrepreneur Freddie Hornik, who had previously worked at Chelsea's Dandie Fashions. For a few months the previous year this had been the Beatles short-lived bespoke store Apple Tailoring.

Hornik brought in two New Yorkers, Gene Krell and Marty Breslau, and the team introduced a new, more dandified phase with rhinestone and appliquéd velvet suits and stack-heeled boots sold to such performers as Rod Stewart, Ronnie Wood and Keith Richards.

The London shop closed in 1974 with the acquisition of the name by Byron Hector, who moved the premises along the King's Road. This was closed in 1979.

Hornik retired to south London. He died, aged 65, on 19 February 2009.

Image gallery

See also 
 Afghan coat
 Top Gear
 Hapshash and the Coloured Coat

References

External links 
 Granny Takes a Trip at the Vintage Fashion Guild

Clothing retailers of England
Clothing companies of England
Shops in London
Buildings and structures in the Royal Borough of Kensington and Chelsea
Defunct retail companies of the United Kingdom
Defunct companies based in London
Retail companies established in 1966
Retail companies disestablished in 1973
1966 establishments in England
1973 disestablishments in England
1960s in England
King's Road, Chelsea, London